Kenneth E. Whitlock Sr. (March 23, 1920January 31, 2012) was an American professional gridiron football player for the Toronto Argonauts of the Interprovincial Rugby Football Union (IRFU), which later became part of the Canadian Football League (CFL). He was the first Black player for the Argonauts. After earning a master's degree in education, he became a school principal.

Early life and college
Whitlock was born in Sewickley, Pennsylvania, the son of Frank Whitlock Sr., who was the first Black on Sewickley High School's football team in 1906. Following his father, Ken Whitlock also played football at Sewickley High.

Whitlock attended Virginia State College, where he played football with the Trojans. He earned Negro All-American honors as a junior in 1940. He left college to work, later returning to Sewickley to join the United States Marine Corps during World War II. The first Black marine from Allegheny County, he served in an all-Black combat unit, the 51st Defense Battalion based in North Carolina. He returned to college after the war, changing his major from agriculture to physical education.

Professional football career
In 1948, Whitlock joined the Toronto Argonauts of the IRFU. The Argonauts had won three straight league titles with an all-Canadian roster. According to Whitlock, professional football in the United States was mostly segregated at the time, which led him to view Canada as his opportunity for a career in sports. At age 28, the  passing and kicking halfback became the first Black player for the Argonauts. In his regular-season debut, he scored on a punt for a rouge in a 20–7 win over Montreal. In the following game against Hamilton, Whitlock scored six points in the fourth quarter, including a five-yard touchdown run, helping lead Toronto to a 14–7 win. He played a total of four games for the Argonauts before being released.

Later years
Whitlock returned to Virginia and earned a master's degree in education. In 1953, he was named the acting principal of the Mary M. Scott School, a new elementary school within the Richmond Public Schools in Richmond, Virginia. He was a principal at five schools before he retired in 1980. After beginning research for his autobiography in 1986, Breaking Barriers: The Ken Whitlock Story was published in 2001.

Publications

See also
History of African Americans in the Canadian Football League

Notes

References

1920 births
2012 deaths
Canadian football running backs
Toronto Argonauts players
Virginia State Trojans football players
African-American players of Canadian football
People from Sewickley, Pennsylvania
Players of American football from Pennsylvania
Sportspeople from the Pittsburgh metropolitan area
United States Marine Corps personnel of World War II
20th-century African-American sportspeople
21st-century African-American people
African Americans in World War II
African-American United States Navy personnel